Ed Kassian (born June 18, 1933) was a Canadian ice hockey player with the Penticton Vees. He won a gold medal at the 1955 World Ice Hockey Championships in West Germany. He also played for the Prince Albert Mintos, Saskatoon Quakers, Vancouver Canucks, New Westminster Royals, and Kamloops Elks.

References

1933 births
Living people
Canadian ice hockey left wingers
Penticton Vees players
People from Vegreville